Ernest William "Bill" Cloke was a New Zealand rugby league player who represented New Zealand.

Playing career
Bill Cloke began his career playing for Otahuhu United in 1916. During the 1917 season he transferred to the Newton Rangers. Cloke played for New Zealand on the 1919 tour of Australia, where no test matches were played.

On 24 July 1920 he played for Auckland against the touring Great Britain Lions. They won 24–16, becoming the first New Zealand team to defeat Great Britain on New Zealand soil.

Selector
Cloke later became a selector for Auckland in the 1940s.

References

New Zealand rugby league players
New Zealand national rugby league team players
Auckland rugby league team players
Otahuhu Leopards players
Newton Rangers players
Rugby league wingers
1892 births
1956 deaths